Pranav Ashar (born 10 January 1988) is an Indian and VR filmmaker and founder of the media company, Enlighten. He has won the British Council Young Creative Entrepreneur

References

External links

Film directors from Mumbai
1988 births
Living people
Place of birth missing (living people)